The year 1637 in music involved some significant events.

Events
The first public opera house, Teatro San Cassiano, opens in Venice.
Johann Jakob Froberger travels to Rome to study under Girolamo Frescobaldi.
Delphin Strungk becomes organist at the Marienkirche in Brunswick.
Robert Ramsey, organist of Trinity College, Cambridge, becomes Master of the Children at the college.
Antonio Cesti joins the Franciscan order.
The Westminster Musicians Guild attempts to assert control over the musicians of London, in competition with the Worshipful Company of Musicians.

Classical music
Benedetto Ferrari – Musiche varier a voce sola, volume 2, published in Venice
Girolamo Frescobaldi – Partite sopra l'aria della Romanesca
Tarquinio Merula – Canzoni overo Sonate concertate per chiesa e camera

Opera
Benedetto Ferrari & Francesco Manelli – Andromeda (the first publicly shown opera, premièred at Teatro San Cassiano in Venice, during carnival)
Virgilio Mazzocchi & Marco Marazzoli – Chi soffre, speri (premièred February 12)

Births
February 11 – Friedrich Nicolaus Brauns, composer and music director (died 1718)
December 7 – Bernardo Pasquini, composer of opera and church music (died 1710)
date unknown – Giovanni Grancino, luthier (died 1709)
probable – Dieterich Buxtehude (died 1707)

Deaths
May 29 – Jiří Třanovský, hymn-writer (born 1592)
July 6 – Charles d'Ambleville, French composer
September 14 – Theodoor Rombouts, painter of musicians (born 1597)
dates unknown – Basilius Froberger and Anna Froberger, parents of Johann Jakob Froberger (plague)

 
17th century in music
Music by year